Myriostoma coliforme is a fungal species in the family Geastraceae. Basidiocarps resemble earthstars, but the spore sac is supported by multiple columns (instead of a single column) and has multiple ostioles instead of a single, apical ostiole. In the UK, its recommended English name is pepper pot. It has also been called "salt-shaker earthstar". The fungus has a north temperate distribution, but was formerly thought to be more widespread due to confusion with related Myriostoma species. Myriostoma coliforme is an uncommon species and appears on the Red Lists of 12 European countries. In 2004 it was one of 33 species proposed for protection under the Bern Convention by the European Council for Conservation of Fungi.

Taxonomy
The species was first mentioned in the scientific literature by Samuel Doody in the second edition of John Ray's Synopsis methodica stirpium Britannicarum in 1696. Doody briefly described the fungus as: "fungus pulverulentus, coli instar perforatus, cum volva stellata" (a powdery fungus, perforated like a colander, with a star-shaped volva), and went on to explain that he found it in 1695 in Kent. It was first described scientifically as a new species in 1785 from collections made in England by James Dickson, who named it Lycoperdon coliforme. He found it growing in roadside banks and hedgerows among nettles in Suffolk and Norfolk. Nicaise Auguste Desvaux first defined and published the new genus Myriostoma in 1809, with the species renamed Myriostoma anglicum (an illegitimate renaming). Christian Hendrik Persoon had previously placed the species in Geastrum in 1801, while in 1821 Samuel Frederick Gray described the genus Polystoma for it. Myriostoma coliforme received its current and final name when August Carl Joseph Corda moved Dickson's name to Myriostoma in 1842, replacing Desvaux's illegitimate name.

Etymology
The botanical name: Myriostoma derives from Greek words "Myrios" (ten thousand - as in Myriad) and "stoma" (mouth) and it means "thousands of mouths". The specific epithet is derived from the [Latin] words colum, meaning "strainer", and forma, meaning "shape". M.J. Berkeley gave it the English name "Cullenden puff-ball" which also refers to a colander. S.F. Gray called it the "sievelike pill-box".

Description

The fruit bodies start their development underground or buried in leaf debris, linked to a strand of mycelium at the base. As they mature, the exoperidium (the outer tissue layer of the peridium) splits open into 7 to 14 rays which curve backward; this pushes the fruit body above the substrate. The rays are of unequal size, with tips that often roll back inward. They comprise three distinct layers of tissue. The inner pseudoparenchymatous layer (so named for the resemblance to the tightly packed cells of plant parenchyma) is fleshy and thick when fresh, and initially pale beige but darkening to yellow or brown as it matures, often cracking and peeling off in the process. The exterior mycelial layer, often matted with fine leaf debris or dirt, usually cracks to reveal a middle fibrous layer, which is made of densely packed hyphae 1–2.5 μm wide. The base of the fruit body is concave to vaulted and often covered with adhering dirt. The roughly spherical spore sac (endoperidium) measures  in diameter, and is supported by a cluster of short columns shaped like flattened spheres. It is grey-brown and minutely roughened with small (under 0.1 mm high), lightly interconnected warts. There are several to many evenly dispersed mouths, the ostioles, mainly on the upper half of the endoperidium. They are roughly circular with fimbriate edges. The inedible fruit bodies have no distinct taste, although dried specimens develop an odour resembling curry powder or bouillon cubes.

Like earthstars, the fungus uses the force of falling raindrops to help disperse the spores, which are ejected in little bursts when objects (such as rain) strike the outer wall of the spore sac. The gleba is brown to greyish-brown, with a cotton-like texture that, when compressed, allows the endoperidium to flex quickly and create a puff of air that is forced out through the ostioles. This generates a cloud of spores that can then be carried by the wind. There are columellae (sterile structures that start at the base of the gleba and extend through it), which are usually not evident in the mature gleba, but apparent at the base of the spore sac. The columellae are not connected to the ostioles, but rather, terminate within the gleba at some distance from them. The capillitia (sterile strands within the gleba) are long, slender, free, tapering, unbranched, and 3.3–4 μm thick, with thickened walls. The spores are spherical, nonamyloid, and are ornamented with irregularly shaped flaring protuberances up to 1.6 μm high. They measure 6.1–8.0 μm including the ornamentation.

Similar species
In Europe, Myriostoma coliforme is a distinctive species easily characterized by the multiple openings on its spore sac and the multiple stalks supporting the sac. Historically, it was thought that the holes might have been a result of insects. This was discussed and rejected by Thomas Jenkinson Woodward in 1797: "It has been doubted whether these mouths might not be accidental, and formed by insects after the expansion of the plant. But this (not to mention their regularity, and that each is furrowed by its border of cilia) is clearly disproved, from the marks of the projections formed by the mouths being seen on the expanded rays, when freshly opened ... I have likewise found an abortive plant, in which the seed did not ripen; but which had numerous projecting papillae on the head, where the mouths should have been formed."

In North America, a second species, Myriostoma calongei, is known from New Mexico. It can be distinguished by its more distinctly verrucose (finely warted) endoperidium, with warts more than 0.1 mm high.

Habitat and distribution

Myriostoma coliforme is saprotrophic, deriving nutrients from decomposing organic matter. Fruit bodies grow grouped in well-drained or sandy soil, often in the partial shade of trees. The species occurs in deciduous forests and mixed forests, gardens, along hedges and grassy road banks, and grazed grasslands. It tends to grow on well-drained south-facing slopes. In Europe, its major habitat is riparian mixed forests dominated by Salix alba and Populus alba along the great rivers. In Hawaii, it has been collected at elevations above  where it appears to favour the mamane (Sophora chrysophylla) forest.

The species is widespread in north temperate regions. It is rare in Europe, where it appears on the Regional Red Lists of 12 countries, and is one of 33 candidate species for listing in Appendix I of the Convention on the Conservation of European Wildlife and Natural Habitats (the "Bern Convention"). Although originally described from England, it was considered extinct in mainland Britain until it was found again in Suffolk in 2006 near Ipswich, one of its original localities; it had been last reported in the country in 1880. The fungus is considered extinct in Switzerland. Its most northerly location is southern Sweden, although it is generally rare in northern Europe. It is similarly widespread but rarely encountered in North America, although there may be isolated localities, like New Mexico, where it is more abundant.

Until 2017, Myriostoma coliforme was thought to be the only species in the genus Myriostoma, with a worldwide distribution. Since then molecular research, based on cladistic analysis of DNA sequences, has revealed at least five additional species in Central and South America, South Africa, and Australia. As a result the distribution of Myriostoma coliforme sensu stricto is uncertain, but it appears to be restricted to the northern hemisphere.

Notes

References

External links 
Lectotype illustration from Tab. III of James Dickson's 1776 Fasciculus plantarum cryptogamicarum Britanniae

Fungi described in 1785
Fungi of Africa
Fungi of Asia
Fungi of Europe
Fungi of North America
Geastraceae
Taxa named by James Dickson (botanist)